Chris Hunter (born November 27, 1972 in Winnipeg, Manitoba) is a former field hockey forward from Canada, who earned a total number of 69 international caps for the Women's National Team during her career in the 1990s. She started playing hockey in high school (Grant Park H.S.) in Winnipeg. Hunter studied Occupational Therapy at the University of Alberta.

References 

1972 births
Living people
Canadian female field hockey players
Field hockey players from Winnipeg
Pan American Games medalists in field hockey
Pan American Games bronze medalists for Canada
Field hockey players at the 1995 Pan American Games
Medalists at the 1995 Pan American Games
Field hockey players at the 1998 Commonwealth Games
Commonwealth Games competitors for Canada
20th-century Canadian women
21st-century Canadian women